This article lists open, former and demolished places of worship situated within the boundaries of the City of Wakefield.

Open places of worship

Ackworth

Badsworth

Castleford

Featherstone

Knottingley

Normanton

Ossett

Pontefract

Wakefield

Former places of worship

Featherstone
North Featherstone Gospel Hall (closed)

West Bretton

References

See also
List of places of worship in the City of Leeds

City of Wakefield
Wakefield, City of
Wakefield, City of